Sophie Lorain (born Sophie-Hélène Lorain; 20 November 1957) is a French-Canadian actress, director and producer.  She is known for having played Anne Fortier in the highly rated television series Fortier that first aired in Quebec, Canada. She is the daughter of actors Jacques Lorain and Denise Filiatrault. Her sister is French-Canadian actress Danièle Lorain.

In addition to her work as an actress, she has directed the films Heat Wave (Les grandes chaleurs) and Slut in a Good Way (Charlotte a du fun), as well as episodes of the television series La galère and Nouvelle adresse.

She is married to director and cinematographer Alexis Durand-Brault.

Awards
Gemini Award—Best Actress in a Dramatic Series (2000 - Fortier)
Gemini Award—Best Supporting Actress (1996 - Omertà: The Code of Silence)

Filmography

Film

Television

References

External links
 
 Profile page on agent's website

1957 births
Actresses from Montreal
Canadian film actresses
Canadian television actresses
Canadian Screen Award winners
Living people
Canadian women film directors
Film directors from Montreal
Canadian television directors
Canadian women television directors